Éric Boyer (2 December 1963) is a French former professional road bicycle racer.

Boyer was born in Choisy-le-Roi.  In the 1988 Tour de France, he finished in 5th place in the overall classification - the highest placed French finisher. Boyer won a stage in the 1991 Giro d'Italia.

After his racing career, Boyer worked for television (including Eurosport and L'Equipe) and newspapers. He was manager of the Cofidis team from 2005 until June 2012. In addition he briefly served as president of the AIGCP from 2008 to 2009.

Major results

1986
Antibes
Grand Prix de Rennes
Tour de France:
Winner stage 2 (TTT)
1988
Meymac
Tour de France:
5th place overall classification
1990
Giro d'Italia:
Winner stages 2 and 15
Castillon-la-Bataille
1991
Giro d'Italia:
Winner stage 4
1992
Tour du Limousin
1993
Route du Sud

References

External links 

1963 births
Living people
People from Choisy-le-Roi
French male cyclists
Sportspeople from Val-de-Marne
Tour de Suisse stage winners
Cyclists from Île-de-France
French Giro d'Italia stage winners